Type P3 ships were built for  the American Export Lines.

Ocean liners
Passenger ships of the United States
Transatlantic shipping companies
Type P3 ships